An outdoor 1977 bronze sculpture of the Simón Bolívar by C. Talacca is installed in Hermann Park's McGovern Centennial Gardens in Houston, Texas, United States. The bust was dedicated in 1978.

See also
 1977 in art
 List of places and things named after Simón Bolivar
 List of public art in Houston

References

1977 establishments in Texas
1977 sculptures
Bronze sculptures in Texas
Busts in Texas
Hermann Park
Monuments and memorials in Texas
Monuments to Simón Bolívar
Outdoor sculptures in Houston
Sculptures of men in Texas